Newbern Depot, also known as Newbern Illinois Central Depot or as the Newbern–Dyersburg station, is an Amtrak station and museum in Newbern, Tennessee. It is an unstaffed flag stop on the City of New Orleans route, which serves Newbern and nearby Dyersburg when passengers have tickets to and from the station. The building was constructed by Illinois Central Railroad in 1920 and was added to the National Register of Historic Places in 1993.

History 
The depot was built in 1920 by the Illinois Central Railroad. The third station erected at Newbern, it replaced a wooden building that burned in 1918. The new brick facility was a combination depot that accommodated both passenger and freight services in a single one-story building, along with a railroad business office. It was built to a standard floor plan with little architectural ornamentation, but the windows and eaves show Craftsman influences. Adjacent to the depot building is a cotton-loading platform where bales of cotton were taken off wagons and transferred to railcars during the era when Newbern was a center for the cotton ginning and shipment of cotton grown in surrounding counties.

Illinois Central Railroad ceased passenger train service to the depot in 1965. The building was then used for storage until 1990, when it was acquired by the city of Newbern to create the Newbern Depot and Railroad Museum. To pay for a restoration, the town held a fundraising event, "Depot Days", which has become an annual celebration in the town. It was subsequently restored based on the original architectural drawings, and was added to the National Register of Historic Places on March 25, 1993, as Newbern Illinois Central Depot. In 1992, Amtrak service was moved from the small stop in nearby Dyersburg to the restored Newbern Depot in order to serve both towns; it is thus sometimes called the Newbern-Dyersburg station. Amtrak's City of New Orleans train comes through twice a day; the depot is a flag stop, meaning passengers can get on or off the train, but there is no staffed ticketing or baggage service. The museum exhibits old photos, railroad tools, uniforms, schedules, and other memorabilia, along with model trains and artwork commemorating the town's railroading past.

This station and Memphis Central Station are the only Amtrak stations in Tennessee.

References

External links 

 Newbern Depot Museum – Facebook site
 Great River Road: Visitors Guide to the Newbern Depot & Railroad Museum

Amtrak stations in Tennessee
Railway stations in the United States opened in 1920
Buildings and structures in Dyer County, Tennessee
Museums in Dyer County, Tennessee
Railroad museums in Tennessee
Railway stations on the National Register of Historic Places in Tennessee
Former Illinois Central Railroad stations
National Register of Historic Places in Dyer County, Tennessee